John Michael Toland (born August 31, 1973) is a former American professional wrestler, better known by his ring name, Tank Toland. Toland is best known for his appearances on the independent circuit with promotions such as Ring of Honor, as well as his appearances with World Wrestling Entertainment on its SmackDown! brand in 2005 to 2006 as James Dick.

Professional wrestling career
Toland was trained at The Monster Factory and made his debut in 2000.

World Wrestling Entertainment (2003–2006)
Toland wrestled in World Wrestling Entertainment's developmental territory Ohio Valley Wrestling starting in May 2003, teaming with Chris Cage. The babyface duo won the Tag title three times. During 2005 Toland turned heel and began to team with Chad Wicks, who posed as his cousin, Chad Toland they wrestled as the Blond Bombers and on April 12, 2005 the team won the OVW Tag Team Title from the Thrillseekers (Matt Cappotelli and Johnny Jeter). Toland also went on to hold the OVW Heavy Weight Title from which he took from his former partner Chris Cage. He held it until he had to surrender it due to his first torn biceps that required surgery. While in OVW Toland was voted by the fans to be both the most popular babyface as well as most popular heel, which made him one of the major draws for the company.

Toland made his debut as a heel on WWE Friday Night SmackDown as James Dick along with his partner, Chad Toland who was now using the name Chad Dick on October 14, 2005 as The Dicks. Their gimmick was dressing up like chippendales and using body oil (which was really water) to spray in their baby-face opponents eyes. After The Mexicools won their 8-man tag match with their partners Road Warrior Animal and Heidenreich by defeating Paul Burchill and William Regal and MNM, The Mexicools were ambushed by the Dicks, and in the process they threw the then current WWE Cruiserweight Champion, Juventud out of the ring and laid out Super Crazy and Psicosis using two of their signature tag team finishers.

On the October 28 episode of SmackDown, The Dicks appeared once again, helping MNM capture the WWE Tag Team Championship when they attacked Heidenreich before Paul Burchill was about to receive the Doomsday Device finisher. This began a brawl with all the teams as the Dicks began attacking Road Warrior Animal. This allowed MNM to hit the Snapshot on Heidenreich and win the title.

On the November 5 episode of Velocity, The Dicks made their in ring debut in WWE defeating jobbers James Prentice and Kevin Antonio. On the November 25 episode of SmackDown, The Dicks made their official SmackDown! debuts, defeating Heidenreich and Road Warrior Animal after blinding Road Warrior Animal with body oil.

On February 22, 2006,  however, The Dicks were released from their WWE contracts. Their last match in WWE was on SmackDown which was broadcast on February 24, 2006, where The Dicks were defeated by The Boogeyman. Both men returned to Ohio Valley Wrestling, where Toland and Wicks began an angle together.

In May 2006, while still wrestling for OVW, ROH and other promotions, Toland became the head instructor for OVW/WWE's developmental amateur class. He was responsible for training new students as well as WWE contracted wrestlers that were new to the wrestling business.

Ring of Honor (2006–2008)
In late 2006, Toland began wrestling for the Philadelphia based promotion Ring of Honor, being called "The All Natural Superior Athlete" Tank Toland. He made his debut at Suffocation on October 17, competing in a Four Corners Survival match against Roderick Strong, Chris Hero and Mark Briscoe. Toland wrestled several shows for ROH in 2006, his final being at The Chicago Spectacular: Night Two, before taking time off from the company due to a torn biceps that required surgery.

At the Fifth Year Festival: Dayton on February 23, 2007, Toland returned to ROH after being hired by Larry Sweeney as the new personal trainer to his client, Chris Hero. In his return match, he defeated Mitch Franklin, a student from the ROH Wrestling School. He was a member of Sweeney's Sweet 'n' Sour Inc. faction. On June 27, 2008, he made his return to the faction, teaming with Shane Hagadorn.

Personal life

Toland grew up on the beaches of Margate City, New Jersey where he is a Lieutenant lifeguard on the Beach Patrol. He attended Atlantic City High School where he was a captain of both his football and baseball teams. He was also active in both school programs and community charity work. Toland continues to stay active within the community and the support of various charities.

Along with being a professional wrestler, Toland holds multiple degrees in Exercise Physiology, Kinesiology, Teaching Health and Physical Education and has a minor in Psychology from West Chester University. Toland was a successful teacher of health and physical education before making the transition to professional wrestling. He is now back to pursuing his teaching career, working full-time as a physical education teacher at Atlantic City High School while still wrestling part-time.

In 2009, Toland got engaged to professional wrestler Jillian Fletcher, better known by her ring name Jillian Hall, whom he met when they were both training at Ohio Valley Wrestling. They have since separated.

Championships and accomplishments
Extreme Wrestling Federation
Xtreme 8 Tournament (2007)
Ohio Valley Wrestling
OVW Southern Tag Team Championship (4 times) – with Chris Cage (3) and Chad Toland (1)
Pro Wrestling Illustrated
PWI ranked him #141 of the 500 best singles wrestlers of the PWI 500 in 2006

References

External links

American male professional wrestlers
Professional wrestlers from New Jersey
Atlantic City High School alumni
West Chester University alumni
Sportspeople from Atlantic City, New Jersey
People from Margate City, New Jersey
Living people
1973 births